Lepidochrysops labeensis, the Labe giant Cupid, is a butterfly in the family Lycaenidae. It is found in Guinea.

Adults have been recorded in June.

References

Butterflies described in 2000
Lepidochrysops
Endemic fauna of Guinea
Butterflies of Africa